Ákos Gacsal (born 19 January 1994) is a Hungarian-born Slovak sprint canoeist.

He won a medal at the 2019 ICF Canoe Sprint World Championships.

References

1994 births
Living people
ICF Canoe Sprint World Championships medalists in kayak
Sportspeople from Komárno
Slovak male canoeists
Canoeists at the 2019 European Games
European Games competitors for Slovakia